In Between is the first studio album by Jazzanova, released in 2002.

Track listing

Charts

References

External links 
 

2002 debut albums
Jazzanova albums
Ropeadope Records albums